Koonyum Sun is the sixth studio album by Australian multi-instrumentalist Xavier Rudd released 19 April 2010.

Musical style
Koonyum Sun shows Rudd returning to the Blues and roots feel of White Moth. The album is credited to the trio of Xavier Rudd and Izintaba. It is his first album with the contributions of bassist Tio Moloantoa and percussionist Andile Nqubezelo.

Track listing

Personnel
Warne Livesey – mixing
Bob Ludwig – mastering
Ken Turta – recording
Terry Murray – engineering
Anthony Lycenko – studio assistant
Ben Mannaa – studio assistant
James Looker – production manager, instrument technician, banjo on "Time to Smile"
Oneill Steyn – drum technician
Xavier Rudd – producer, vocals, harmonica, guitar (acoustic), guitar (electric), slide guitar, didgeridoo
Tio Moloantoa – bass guitar, vocals
Andile Nqubezelo – drums, vocals
Renee Simone – vocals on "Bleed"
Joaquin Rudd – vocals on "Koonyum Sun"
Travis Page – vocals on "Badimo"

Charts

Notes
 King, A. Xavier Rudd: Bathing in Koonyum Sun, retrieved 11 May 2010, from

References

2010 albums
Xavier Rudd albums